Thạnh An is a township of Vĩnh Thạnh District, Cần Thơ, Vietnam.

References

Populated places in Cần Thơ
Townships in Vietnam